Anti-Assyrian sentiment, also known as anti-Assyrianism and Assyrophobia, is a diverse spectrum of negative feelings, dislikes, fears, aversion, racism, derision and/or prejudice towards Assyrians, Assyria, and Assyrian culture. Anti-Assyrian sentiment is largely fueled by an Anti-Christian sentiment, and very rarely for their ethnicity itself.

In Iran 
In October 1917, the Ottomans launched the Persian campaign with the hopes of capturing more land. The Assyrians, led by Agha Petros held them off until June 1918, however, up to 100,000 Assyrians left Persia in 1918, but around half died of Turkish and Kurdish massacres, starvation, disease, or famine.  About 80 percent of Assyrian clergy and influential leaders had perished.

The city of Urmia and the areas around it, 200 villages were ravaged, 200,000 of Assyrian dead, and hundreds of thousands more Assyrians starving to death in exile. The Associated Press reported that in the vicinity of Urmia, "Turkish regular troops and Kurds are persecuting and massacring Assyrian Christians." The victims included 800 massacred near Urmia, and 2,000 dead from disease. Two hundred Assyrians were burned to death inside a church, and the Russians had discovered more than 700 bodies of massacre victims in the village of Hafdewan outside Urmia, "mostly naked and mutilated", some with gunshot wounds, others decapitated, and others chopped to pieces. The New York Times reported on 11 October that 12,000 Assyrian Christians had died of massacre, hunger, or disease; thousands of girls as young as seven had been raped in sex attacks, or forcibly converted to Islam; Christian villages had been destroyed, and three-fourths of these Christian villages were burned to the ground.

In Iraq 
Christian priests were prime targets; eight Assyrian priests were killed during the massacre, including one beheaded and another burned alive. Back in the city of Duhok, 600 Assyrians were killed by Sidqi's men. In the end, around 65 Assyrian villages were targeted in the Mosul and Dohuk districts. The Simele massacre of the Assyrian people is often regarded as a phase of the Assyrian genocide beginning in August 1914 in the early days of what became World War I. Today, most of these villages are inhabited by Kurds. The main campaign lasted until August 16, but violent raids on Assyrians were being reported up to the end of the month. After the campaign, Bakr Sidqi was invited to Baghdad for a victory rally. The campaign resulted in one third of the Assyrian population of Iraq fleeing to Syria.

After the Invasion of Iraq and fall of Saddam Hussein, Assyrians became victims of Islamist violence. During the period of 2003-2013, there were increasing amounts of Church attacks, beheadings, and bombings of Assyrians.

After the Fall of Mosul, ISIS demanded that Assyrian Christians living in the city convert to Islam, pay jizyah, or face execution, by July 19, 2014. ISIS leader Abu Bakr al-Baghdadi further noted that Christians who do not agree to follow those terms must "leave the borders of the Islamic Caliphate" within a specified deadline. This resulted in a complete Assyrian exodus from Mosul, marking the end of 1,800 years of continuous Christian presence. A church mass was not held in Mosul for the first time in nearly 2 thousand years.

In Syria 
On 23 February 2015, 150 Assyrians from villages near Tell Tamer in northeastern Syria were kidnapped by ISIS. At Assyrian Christian farming villages on the banks of the Khabur River in Northeast Syria, 253 people, 51 of them children and 84 of them were women, with one account claiming that ISIS is demanding $22 million (or roughly $100,000 per person) for their release. On 8 October 2015, ISIS released a video showing three of the Assyrian men kidnapped in Khabur being murdered. It was reported that 202 of the 253 kidnapped Assyrians were still in captivity, each one with a demanded ransom of $100,000. On 25 October, hundreds of civilians were trapped in Sadad, Syria, with Archbishop Silwanos Al-Nemeh saying that the situation was dire and that they were in fear of a massacre. Also, opposition fighters entered the Mar Theodore Church damaging it and stealing Church items. More than 100 government soldiers and 100 rebels, including 80 jihadists from ISIS and al-Nusra, were killed in the fighting. Foreign rebel fighters were also among the dead. The rebels retreated to the surrounding farmland, with the military in pursuit, and the government news agency reported that the militants had vandalized Sadad's Saint Theodor Church and much of its infrastructure.

See also
 Anti-Armenian sentiment

References

Sources

Persecution of Assyrians
Persecution of Assyrians
Racism